Ziarat (also Romanized as Zīārat, Zeyārat, and Zīyārat) is a village in Howmeh Rural District, in the Central District of Bandar Lengeh County, Hormozgan Province, Iran. At the 2006 census, its population was 174, in 30 families.

References 

Populated places in Bandar Lengeh County